René Gartler (born 21 October 1985) is an Austrian football coach and a former player. He is an assistant coach with LASK.

Career statistics

References

External links
 René Gartler Interview
 Rauswurf und Maulkorb für Rene Gartler
 Gartler unterschrieb beim Lask

1985 births
Living people
Footballers from Vienna
Austrian footballers
Austria youth international footballers
Austrian expatriate footballers
Austrian Football Bundesliga players
2. Liga (Austria) players
Austrian Regionalliga players
2. Bundesliga players
SK Rapid Wien players
SKN St. Pölten players
FC Lustenau players
Kapfenberger SV players
SV Sandhausen players
LASK players
FC Juniors OÖ players
Association football forwards
Austrian expatriate sportspeople in Germany
Expatriate footballers in Germany
Austrian football managers